Adolphia is a genus of shrubs in the buckthorn family containing only two species.

These are rigid, thorny, flowering bushes. Adolphia californica , the California prickbush or California spineshrub, are native to southern California and northern Mexico. Adolphia infesta , the junco, is found in Arizona, Texas, New Mexico, and northern Mexico.

This genus is named for the French botanist Adolphe-Théodore Brongniart (1801–1876). It was first described and published in Pl. Vasc. Gen. on page 70 in 1837.

References

External links
Jepson Manual Treatment
USDA Plants Profile

Rhamnaceae
Rhamnaceae genera
Plants described in 1837
Flora of California
Flora of Arizona
Flora of Mexico
Flora of Texas
Flora of New Mexico